Canton Center may refer to:

 Canton Center (MBTA station) in Canton, Massachusetts, United States
 Canton Center Historic District in Canton, Connecticut, United States
 Canton Centre (mall) in Canton, Ohio, United States